Music Inspired by the Life and Times of Scrooge is the first solo album by Finnish songwriter and keyboardist Tuomas Holopainen, best known for his work in the symphonic metal band Nightwish. It was based on cartoonist Don Rosa's The Life and Times of Scrooge McDuck, a graphic novel which featured the Carl Barks  Disney comics character of the same name. Rosa contributed the cover artwork. The first single, "A Lifetime of Adventure" was released on February 5, 2014 along with a music video directed by Ville Lipiäinen.

It features several vocalists including Johanna Kurkela, Tony Kakko of Sonata Arctica and narration by Alan Reid, with lyrics in English and Scottish Gaelic. It also features the London Philharmonic Orchestra, the choir group Metro Voices, and several guest musicians including fellow Nightwish member Troy Donockley.

Track listing

The deluxe digibook also includes a bonus disc with an all instrumental version of the album minus the Alternative Version of "A Lifetime of Adventure".
This Track can be also found on the Standard Edition as a Hidden Track.

Personnel
All information from the album booklet.

Musicians
Tuomas Holopainen – keyboards, piano, producer, photography
Troy Donockley – uilleann pipes, low whistles, bodhran
Mikko Iivanainen – guitars, banjo
Teho Majamäki – didgeridoo
Jon Burr – harmonica

Vocalists
Johanna Kurkela as "Glittering" Goldie o'Gilt (on tracks 1, 2, 4, 6, 8, 9, 10)
Johanna Iivanainen as The Narrator and Downy O'Drake (on tracks 1, 6, 8, 9)
Alan Reid as Scrooge McDuck (on tracks 1, 6, 10)
Tony Kakko as Storyteller (on track 5)

Orchestra and choir
Pip Williams – orchestral arrangement and direction
London Philharmonic Orchestra
Metro Voices

Production
Mika Jussila – mastering, photography
Tero Kinnunen – recording, mixing
Janne Pitkänen – layout
Don Rosa – artwork

Charts and certifications

Charts

The album went Gold in Finland.

References

2014 debut albums
Tuomas Holopainen albums
Nuclear Blast albums
Roadrunner Records albums
Concept albums
The Life and Times of Scrooge McDuck